Candy Store may refer to:

Confectionery store, a store that sells candy (called a confectioner's in the UK)
Candy Store (album), a 2007 jazz album by Candy Dulfer
Candy Store (film), an upcoming film to be directed by Stephen Gaghan
"Candy Store", a song from Heathers: The Musical
Candy Store, compilation album by Norwegian band Minor Majority
"Candy Store", a song by Faber Drive

See also
Candy Shop (disambiguation)